The Northwest Missouri State–Truman football rivalry, also known as the Hickory Stick, is a college football rivalry between NCAA Division II teams Northwest Missouri State University and Truman State University.

It is the oldest traveling trophy in Division II football. No games have been played since 2011, Truman having jumped to the Great Lakes Valley Conference in 2012.

The teams, which are founding members of the Mid-America Intercollegiate Athletics Association have been playing each other since 1908. With the expansion of the MIAA in 2012, teams in the league will play in divisions and the two schools are in different MIAA divisions. Consequently, starting in 2012 they would have played each other every other year.

History
In 1930 Northwest President Uel W. Lamkin proposed the two schools play each other on Veterans Day. The award would be a polished hickory stick which had originally come from the Harrison County, Missouri farm where Northeast president Eugene Fair was born.  Harrison County is in the district where students were supposed to go Northwest instead of Northeast.

The stick is two & a half feet long and tapers from a diameter of 1½” to about 1”. It was polished and lettered in the wood shop at Northwest. When it was created it had the scores from all the games since the two started playing in 1908 through 1930. The winner of the game dips the stick in the school color. The games were played on Veterans Day only in 1931–1933.

Game results
At the conclusion of the September 2, 2011 game, Truman has the edge in the series 54–33–4.

References

College football rivalries in the United States
Northwest Missouri State Bearcats football
Truman Bulldogs football